Kemoko Turay (born July 11, 1995) is an American football defensive end who is a free agent. He played college football at Rutgers and was drafted by the Colts in the second round of the 2018 NFL Draft.

Early life
Turay was born in Montclair, New Jersey. His father is from Guinea, while his mother is from Ivory Coast.

College career
Turay attended and played college football at Rutgers under head coaches Kyle Flood and Chris Ash. Turay had an impressive redshirt freshman season, with 24 tackles, 8 tackles for loss, and 7.5 sacks despite not starting any games.  After this season, he was named to the Freshman All-American team.  After his senior season, Turay was invited to the 2018 Senior Bowl.

Professional career
After his senior season, Turay was invited to the 2018 NFL combine.

Indianapolis Colts
Turay was drafted by the Indianapolis Colts in the second round, 52nd overall, of the 2018 NFL Draft. In Week 3, against the Philadelphia Eagles, he recorded 1.5 sacks for the first ones of his professional career.

In Week 5 of the 2019 season, Turay suffered a broken ankle and was ruled out the rest of the season. He was placed on injured reserve on October 14, 2019.

Turay was placed on the active/physically unable to perform list at the start of training camp on July 28, 2020, and was placed on reserve/PUP to start the season. He was activated on November 17, 2020.

San Francisco 49ers
On April 14, 2022, Turay signed a one-year contract with the San Francisco 49ers. He was released on August 30, 2022 and signed to the practice squad the next day. He was promoted to the active roster on September 14, 2022. He was released on November 26 and re-signed to the practice squad.

References

External links
Rutgers Scarlet Knights bio
Indianapolis Colts bio

1995 births
Living people
Players of American football from Newark, New Jersey
American football defensive ends
Rutgers Scarlet Knights football players
Indianapolis Colts players
San Francisco 49ers players